Bathurst Island may refer to:
 Bathurst Island (Northern Territory), Australia
 Bathurst Island Airport
 Bathurst Island (Nunavut), Canada